Porpax verrucosa is a species of epiphytic orchids native to the Cardamom Mountains in Cambodia.

References

Endemic flora of Cambodia
verrucosa